Courtenay may refer to:

Places

Australia
 Courtenay, Western Australia

Canada
 Courtenay, British Columbia, a city on the east coast of Vancouver Island
 Courtenay River, on Vancouver Island, British Columbia

France
 Courtenay, Isère, a commune in the Isère département
 Courtenay, Loiret, a commune in the Loiret département

New Zealand
 Courtenay, New Zealand, a locality in the Selwyn District
 Courtenay (New Zealand electorate), a former electorate in Canterbury, based on the locality of the same name
 Courtenay River, the short-lived European name of the Waimakariri River

United States
 Courtenay, North Dakota, a city in Stutsman County
 Courtenay, Florida, an unincorporated community in Brevard County

People
 Courtenay (surname)

Given name
Courtenay is a given name variant of Courtney. Notable people with the name include:

Male
 Courtenay Bartholomew (born 1931), Irish physician and scientist
 Courtenay Bennett (1855–1973), British diplomat
 Courtenay Boyle (1770–1844), British Royal Navy officer
 Courtenay Crocker (1881–1944), American attorney and politician
 Courtenay Daley (born 1950), Jamaican cricketer
 Courtenay Dempsey (born 1987), Australian rules footballer
 Courtenay Hughes Fenn (1866–1927), American missionary
 Courtenay Foote (1878–1925), English actor
 Courtenay Griffiths, British lawyer
 Courtenay Adrian Ilbert (1888–1956), English civil engineer and horologist
 Courtenay Ilbert (1841–1924), British lawyer
 Courtenay Knollys (1849-1905), British rower
 Courtenay Mansel (1880–1933), Welsh farmer
 Courtenay Morgan, 1st Viscount Tredegar (1867–1934), British military personnel
 Courtenay Reece (1899–1984), West Indian cricket umpire
 Courtenay Selman (born 1945), Barbadian cricketer
 Courtenay Edward Stevens (1905-1976), British classicist
 Courtenay Warner (1857–1934), British politician

Female
 Courtenay Becker-Dey (born 1965), American sailor
 Courtenay Finn, American curator
 Courtenay Stewart (born 1985), Canadian synchronized swimmer
 Courtenay Taylor (born 1969), American voice actress

See also
 Courtenay Place (disambiguation)
 House of Courtenay
 William Courtenay (disambiguation)
 Courtney (disambiguation)